Kabud Gonbad Rural District is a rural district (dehestan) in the Central District of Kalat County, Razavi Khorasan province, Iran. At the 2006 census, its population was 10,389, in 2,541 families.  The rural district has 21 villages.

References 

Rural Districts of Razavi Khorasan Province
Kalat County